Colin Long (3 March 1918 – 8 November 2009) was an Australian tennis player. He had a notable mixed doubles partnership with fellow Australian Nancye Wynne Bolton. Together they won four Mixed Doubles (1940, 1946, 1947 and 1948) at the Australian Championships, which is an all-time record. In singles, he reached the quarterfinals of the Australian four times (1947, 1948, 1949 and 1950) and the fourth round of both Wimbledon and the U.S. Nationals in 1947. He was a major commentator for Channel 7 for both golf and tennis until the late 1980s.

Life outside tennis
Long was born in Melbourne and attended Melbourne Grammar School, where he was school captain in 1937. He was a lieutenant in the AIF in World War II, serving in the Middle East.

He worked for Dunlop Sport before joining Spalding, where he became deputy chief executive. He appeared as a commentator on Seven Network tennis telecasts in the 1960s and 1970s and also commentated on golf up until the late 1980s alongside Peter Alliss.

In 1943 he married Florence Pelling. She survived him, along with their son and daughter.

Grand Slam finals

Doubles: 2 (2 runner-ups)

Mixed doubles: 6 (4 titles, 2 runner-ups)

References

External links
 
 
 

1918 births
2009 deaths
Australian Championships (tennis) champions
Australian male tennis players
Grand Slam (tennis) champions in mixed doubles
Tennis players from Melbourne
People educated at Melbourne Grammar School
Australian tennis commentators
Australian Army personnel of World War II
Australian Army officers
20th-century Australian people
Military personnel from Melbourne